The 2021–22 New Jersey Devils season was the 48th season for the National Hockey League franchise that was established on June 11, 1974, and 40th season since the franchise relocated from Colorado prior to the 1982–83 NHL season. Before the season, the Devils lost Nathan Bastian to the Seattle Kraken in the 2021 NHL Expansion Draft, but reacquired him in on November 25, 2021.

On March 31, 2022, following an 8–1 loss to the Boston Bruins, the Devils were eliminated from playoff contention for the fourth consecutive season.

Standings

Divisional standings

Conference standings

Schedule and results

Preseason
The preseason schedule was published on July 27, 2021. The Devils' game against the New York Islanders on October 7, 2021, was cancelled due to a power outage at Prudential Center in Newark, New Jersey.

Regular season
The regular season schedule was published on July 22, 2021, with only about a handful of games scheduled in February because NHL players were planning to participate in the 2022 Winter Olympics. However, on December 22, the NHL announced that its players would not participate in the 2022 Winter Olympics due to the ongoing COVID-19 pandemic.

Player statistics
As of May 1, 2022

Skaters

Goaltenders

Transactions
The Devils have been involved in the following transactions during the 2021–22 season.

Trades

Free agents

Waivers

Contract terminations

Signings

Draft picks

Below are the New Jersey Devils' selections at the 2021 NHL Entry Draft, which was held on July 23 and 24, 2021, in a remote format, with teams convening via videoconferencing, and Commissioner Gary Bettman announcing selections from the NHL Network studios in Secaucus, New Jersey.

Notes:
 The New York Islanders' first-round pick went to the New Jersey Devils as the result of a trade on April 7, 2021, that sent Kyle Palmieri and Travis Zajac to New York in exchange for A. J. Greer, Mason Jobst, a conditional 2022 fourth-round pick and this pick.
 The Buffalo Sabres' fifth-round pick went to the New Jersey Devils as the result of a trade on February 24, 2020, that sent Wayne Simmonds to Buffalo in exchange for this pick (being conditional at the time of the trade).
 The Arizona Coyotes' seventh-round pick went to the New Jersey Devils as the result of a trade on October 7, 2020, that sent a 2020 seventh-round pick (192nd overall) to Arizona in exchange for this pick.

Notes

References

New Jersey Devils seasons
New Jersey Devils
New Jersey Devils
New Jersey Devils
New Jersey Devils
21st century in Newark, New Jersey